Lalchhanhima Sailo (22 November 1955 – 4 April 2007) was the founder of Chhinlung Israel People Convention (CIPC) and a leader in the Bnei Menashe community in Mizoram, India. His widow, Lalthlamuani, contested in the Lok Sabha Election 2019 from the Mizoram (Lok Sabha constituency) as an Independent, but lost to C. Lalrosanga of the Mizo National Front.

References

External links
Rabbi backs India's 'lost Jews' BBC News — 1 April 2005
 DNA test — Are Mizos descendants of the lost tribes
 The chief of the Chhinlung Israel People's Convention (CIPC), Lalchhanhima Sailo, is reiterating a decades-old claim that a section of Mizos are descended from the Bnei Menashe clan, one of the legendary lost tribes
 An aspiring politician and businessman, Lalchhanhima Sailo
 Sailo said that Mizo were the lost tribe of Manasi Ephrain of Israel which crossed the Red Sea in 720 BC. They crossed Gajon river of Afghanistan and entered upper part of Jammu and Kashmir through which they went to China. He claimed that there was historic evidence that their forefather were participated in Great Wall of China and participated war for China emperor She Wang Ti. Later on one group migrated to Japan and one towards western Myanmar. From Myanmar they have settled in Manipur, Mizoram, Tripura, Bangladesh and Mizoram. Sailo said that during British regime they were called as Chin Kuki Lusai, which was never a part of British India and British Burma but originally they should be called as Chhin Lung Chhuak which mean man came out from cave. He even claimed that Mizo have the song and rituals where it has similar with Hebrew as for example song of crossing Red Sea, Sacrification, Ekhat Adoni etc.

Indian Jews
1955 births
2007 deaths
Mizoram politicians
Mizo people